Credal networks are probabilistic graphical models based on imprecise probability. Credal networks can be regarded as an extension of Bayesian networks, where credal sets replace probability mass functions in the specification of the local models for the network variables given their parents. As a Bayesian network defines a joint probability mass function over its variables, a credal network defines a joint credal set. The way this credal set is defined depends on the particular notion of independence for imprecise probability adopted. Most of the research on credal networks focused on the case of strong independence. Given strong independence the joint credal set associated to a credal network is called its strong extension.

 
where  denote the convex hull.

Inference
Inference on a credal network is intended as the computation of the bounds of an expectation with respect to its strong extensions. When computing the bounds of a conditional event, inference is called updating.

 

Being a generalization of the same problem for Bayesian networks, updating with credal networks is a NP-hard task. Yet a number of algorithm have been specified.

See also
 Imprecise probability
 Credal set
 Bayesian network

References

Cozman, F.G., 2000. Credal networks. Artificial intelligence, 120(2), pp. 199–233.

Bayesian inference